Believe is the seventh studio album by classical crossover artist Katherine Jenkins and was released on 26 October 2009 in the UK.

Jenkins described this album as her most accessible to date, with many more popular songs such as Evanescence's "Bring Me to Life".

Track listing

International edition 

See also Deluxe edition and Platinum edition for track listings on the international released version of Believe.

U.S. edition

Deluxe edition 
The deluxe edition of the album, released on 29 March 2010 in the UK, includes two new tracks: "Love Never Dies" and "Endless Love", with a total of 13 tracks.
The track "Se Si Perde Un Amore" from the standard edition is not included.

Platinum edition 
The Platinum edition of the album, released on 6 December 2010 in the UK, includes four new tracks ("Tell Me I'm Not Dreaming", "Gravity", "In The Bleak Midwinter", and a live version of "O Holy Night" with Michael Bolton), plus a DVD film documentary including all promo videos from the Believe campaign ("Bring Me To Life", "Angel", "Love Never Dies"), two full live tracks from her London O2 show, international TV appearances and video diaries from her Argentina promo tour.

Remixes 
Almighty Records remixed two tracks from the album as promos: "Bring Me to Life" and "Who Wants to Live Forever". Katherine Jenkins performed the Almighty remix versions to these tracks at the London nightclub Heaven for their G-A-Y night on 24 October 2009. Jenkins is the first classical singer to headline at G-A-Y night.

Bring Me to Life
 Released: 23 October 2009
 Label: Warner
 Almighty Remix (Club Mix) – 7:05
 Almighty Remix (Radio Edit) – 3:10
 Original – 3:46

Who Wants To Live Forever
 Released: 2009
 Label: Warner
 Almighty Radio Edit – 4:11
 Almighty Club Mix – 7:17
 Almighty Dub Remix – 7:18
 Almighty Instrumental – 7:18
 Original Mix – 4:07

Charts

Year-end charts

Certifications

Personnel 
 Katherine Jenkins  – vocals (tracks 1, 4, 6–7, 9–10, 12, lead on 2–3, 5, 8, 11)
 David Foster  – musical arrangement (tracks 1–7, 9–12), orchestral arrangement (1–6, 9–11), keyboards (1–7, 9–11), piano (12)
 Bill Ross  - musical arrangement (tracks 7, 12), orchestral arrangement (1–6, 9–11), string arrangement (8)
 Armin Steiner  - orchestra recording engineer (tracks 1–6, 9–11)
 Gina Zimmitti  - orchestra contractor (tracks 1–6, 9–11)
 Larry Mah  - Pro-Tools recording engineer (tracks 1–4, 6–12)
 Brett Parker  - assistant recording engineer (tracks 1–4, 6–12)
 Jorge Vivo  - additional recording engineer (tracks 1–4, 6–12)
 Dean Parks  – guitar (tracks 2–3, 8)
 Angela Fisher  - choir contractor (tracks 2–3, 8, 11), choir director (2–3, 8, 11)
 David Reitzas  - choir recording engineer (tracks 2–3, 8, 11)
 Courtney Blooding  – production coordinator (All tracks), background vocals (track 2)
 Jochem van der Saag  - sound designer (All tracks), drum machine (All tracks), musical arrangement (track 8), synthesizer (2, 11), keyboards (8), background vocals (8), recording engineer (5), audio mixing (5)
 Gayle Levant  – harp (track 3)
 Andrea Bocelli  – flute (track 4), vocals (4)
 Richard Marx  - background vocals (track 5)
 Michael Thompson  – guitar (tracks 5, 11)
 Vanessa Freebairn-Smith  – cello (track 6)
 André Rieu  - violin (track 7)
 Cody Carey  – lead vocals (track 8)
 Chris Botti  – trumpet (track 10)

References 

Katherine Jenkins albums
2009 albums
Warner Music Group albums